There are 39 stations in the Copenhagen Metro, a driverless rapid transit system serving Copenhagen, Frederiksberg and Tårnby in Denmark. Of the original 22 metro stations, nine are underground, twelve are elevated, and one is at street level. Christianshavn Station offers transfer between the system's two original lines (M1 and M2), which share track between Vanløse and Christianshavn stations. From Christianshavn, M1 branches south traveling to Vestamager Station, while M2 heads southeast to Lufthavnen Station, which serves Copenhagen Airport.

The City Circle Line, which opened on 29 September 2019, has 17 stations, with transfer between the current and new lines at Frederiksberg and Kongens Nytorv stations. The new lines have a stop at Copenhagen Central Station (København H), the largest train station in Denmark. On 28 March 2020, the first part of the M4 line opened, adding two additional stations and an increased number of trains on the København H - Østerport part of the City Circle Line. Transfer from the Copenhagen Metro to regional trains is possible at Copenhagen Central Station, Lufthavnen, Nørreport, Ørestad and Østerport stations. Transfers to S-train services are possible at Copenhagen Central Station, Nørreport, Østerport, Nørrebro, Flintholm, Vanløse and Nordhavn stations.

The Copenhagen Metro opened in 2002, with additional stations opening in 2003, and the M2 branch to the airport completed in 2007. It takes 23 minutes to travel on each line from one end to the other. The City Circle Line is intended to form a  loop around the city center, with a full circumference taking 25 minutes. The M3 line follows the full circle whilst the M4 line only operates along the eastern half. The system is owned by Metroselskabet, a company owned jointly by the municipalities of Copenhagen and Frederiksberg, and the government of Denmark. The metro and its 34 trains are operated by the private company Metro Service.

Key

The following two lists name the stations. The first lists the stations that opened between 2002 and 2020. It states the station's name, which lines serve it, whether it is elevated or underground (the grade), travel time in minutes to Nørreport, the ticket zone and any transfer possibilities available at the station. The second table lists those stations on the future M4 line which are yet to be built.

List of stations

Future stations

† Terminal station.
# Transfer station.
 
The M4 was originally planned to service Trianglen, Poul Henningsens Plads, Vibenshus Runddel and Nørrebro stations on a temporary basis. This plan was later abandoned. Since its opening, the M4 serves the København H - Østerport - Orientkaj route. The City Circle Line opened on 29 September 2019 and two Nordhavn stations  opened on 28 March 2020. An extension with five Sydhavn stations (Ny Elleberg - København H) is expected to open in 2024.

The Nordhavn end of the M4 has 2 stations, while the Sydhavn end will have 5 stations.
As the built up areas of Nordhavn expand towards the North-East, no less than 9 versions of a future extension have been examined.

References

External links

 Interactive Copenhagen Metro Map
 Metrostationer 
 Nordhavn extension
 Sydhavn extension

 
Metro stations
Copenhagen Metro
Copenhagen Metro